Chen Wen-ch'i (born ) is a Taiwanese-American entrepreneur who has been President and CEO of VIA Technologies, Inc. since 1992.

Prior to VIA, Chen co-founded and was President and CEO of Symphony Laboratories. He also held positions of Sales & Marketing VP at high tech start-up ULSI and senior architect at Intel. Chen holds a master's degree in electrical engineering from National Taiwan University and a masters in computer science from the California Institute of Technology.

In June 2008, The Forbes ranked him with his wife Cher Wang, the chairperson of HTC, as the fifth richest of Taiwan.

References

External links
VIA Technologies Inc. Executives

Living people
Businesspeople from Taipei
California Institute of Technology alumni
National Taiwan University alumni
Taiwanese Christians
Former billionaires
Year of birth missing (living people)